These are the matches that Bologna have played in European football competitions. The club's first entry into European competitions was the 1964–65 European Cup, with their most recent being the 2002 UEFA Intertoto Cup. Their only trophy in European competitions came in the 1998 UEFA Intertoto Cup.

UEFA-organised seasonal competitions 
Bologna's score listed first.

European Cup

European Cup Winners' Cup

UEFA Cup

UEFA Intertoto Cup

FIFA-only recognized seasonal competitions

Inter-Cities Fairs Cup

Overall record

UEFA Competitions record
Accurate as of 27 August 2017

Source: UEFA.comPld = Matches played; W = Matches won; D = Matches drawn; L = Matches lost; GF = Goals for; GA = Goals against; GD = Goal Difference.

References

Bologna F.C. 1909
Italian football clubs in international competitions